"Girls Need Love" is a song by American singer Summer Walker from their debut commercial mixtape, Last Day of Summer (2018). It was released as the album's lead single on July 26, 2018.

Charts

Weekly charts

Certifications

Remix

The official remix, with Drake, was released on February 10, 2019.

Charts

Weekly charts

Year-end charts

Certifications

References

2018 singles
2019 singles
Drake (musician) songs
Songs written by Drake (musician)